Jeanette Kuvin Oren is an American contemporary artist specializing in Judaic art, fiber art, mosaics, stained glass, calligraphy, papercutting and painting.

Kuvin Oren (born in 1961) graduated from Princeton University (B.A. 1983) and Yale University (M.P.H. 1985). Kuvin Oren had almost completed a PhD in Epidemiology when she decided to become a full-time artist of Judaica. Since 1984, Kuvin Oren has been commissioned by more than 450 synagogues, community centers, day schools and camps across the United States, Canada, South America and the Caribbean. Kuvin Oren is best known for one-of-a-kind Torah covers (Torah mantles), Ark curtains, wall-hangings, Glass Ark Doors, mosaics, stained glass, huppahs (wedding canopies), marriage contracts (ketubot) and papercuttings. Kuvin Oren also designs synagogue interiors.

Kuvin Oren is known for a variety of styles: from "traditional" with muted colors to contemporary with vibrant colors. She dyes her own silk fabrics to create fiber ritual art. She is known for incorporating Jewish history and a knowledge of ritual and tradition into her art. She creates individual pieces and "sets" of pieces for synagogues and individuals who commission her art.

Jeanette Kuvin Oren is the designer of the USPS Hanukkah Stamp 2022.

References

 The New York Times, November 24, 1991 
 Palm Beach Daily News, Sept 23, 2012 
 New Haven Register  September 25, 2011 
 Jerusalem Post  June 25, 2010 
 Jewish Independent January 23, 2004 
 The New York Times January 14, 2001 
 Orlando Sentinel May 17, 2006 
 Connecticut Jewish Ledger 
 Quilting Arts Magazine 
 The Knot

External links
 KuvinOren.com
 Wedding DIY
 Torah covers, Congregation Gates of Heaven, Schenectady, New York
 Meet the Artist

American artists
Jewish American artists
Living people
Yale University alumni
Princeton University alumni
1961 births
21st-century American Jews